"One for the Radio" is a single by British band McFly, released as the first single from their fourth studio album, Radio:Active, which was released 20 July 2008 as a giveaway with the Mail on Sunday. The band's 14th single overall, "One for the Radio" is described as being about the band's "constant struggle for critical acceptance". The single was premiered on BBC Radio 1's Switch with Nick Grimshaw on 1 June 2008. It was the first single that was released under the band's new record label, Super Records, and was also the first McFly single to be A Listed at BBC Radio 1 since "Five Colours in Her Hair".

"One for the Radio" debuted and peak at number two on the UK Singles Chart, behind Dizzee Rascal's "Dance wiv Me", becoming the band's 14th consecutive top 10 single and 13th top-five hit. On the Scottish Singles Chart, the song debuted at the top spot, becoming McFly's eight number one on that chart. Despite its chart success, it remained in the UK top 40 for only two weeks and finished at number 195 on the UK's year-end chart for 2008, the lowest-selling number two of the year. Elsewhere, the song charted in Ireland and Brazil; in the latter country, it received a Platinum certification for sales of over 100,000 downloads.

The music video for the single premiered on 29 June 2008. It was shot in Toronto, Canada and directed by Sum 41's drummer, Steve Jocz. The opening sequence of the video is a reenactment of the beginning scene in the 1985 movie "Back to the Future," from which McFly got their name. The movie features Michael J. Fox, and the McFly video shows Danny Jones, one of the singers and lead guitarists of the band doing the same thing.

Track listing
UK CD1
 "One for the Radio" (Radio Edit) - 3:07
 "Do Ya" (Acoustic Version) - 2:55

UK CD2
 "One for the Radio" (Radio Edit) - 3:07
 "Falling in Love" (Acoustic Version) - 4:11

UK CD3
 "One for the Radio" (Radio Edit) - 3:07
 "POV" (Acoustic Version) - 4:01

Charts

Weekly charts

Year-end charts

Certifications

Release history

References

2008 singles
McFly songs
Songs written by Tom Fletcher
2008 songs
Number-one singles in Scotland